The 1967–68 Illinois Fighting Illini men's basketball team represented the University of Illinois.

Regular season
Harv Schmidt, the 1957 Illini MVP and team captain, returned to his alma mater in 1967 after
serving as an assistant at New Mexico for three years. Schmidt succeeded legendary coach Harry Combes after his dismissal related to a "slush-fund" scandal that devastated both the basketball and football programs for many years into the future.  Schmidt, originally from Kankakee, was the slender 6 foot 6 inch star Illini forward who came highly recommended as both a coach and recruiter. Unfortunately, he had never been a head coach before, but he was considered the best the under the circumstances. Within three years of his arrival, he had brought Illinois back to among the elite programs in the Big Ten. The beginning of his tenure marked what possibly was the high-water mark in fan enthusiasm. Illinois led the nation in attendance in 1970,
averaging 16,128 per home contest, with students routinely camped out for tickets outside
the state-of-the-art Assembly Hall.

Even though Schmidt lacked coaching experience, he believed in the importance of an aggressive, overplaying defense with the intent of frustrating opponents, generating turnovers and creating easy baskets. He was a stickler to detail and used scouting techniques to learn ways of shutting down opponents offenses. Schmidt was always teaching, as well as coaching his teams, in order to compete favorably against any competition.

Due to the scandal that plagued the Illini, Schmidt's first team was primarily made up of walk-ons. Expectations of the 1967–68 team were low, however, they began to surprise even the experts when, in just their second game of the season, the Illini took on hall of fame player Elvin Hayes and the nationally ranked Houston Cougars at the Assembly Hall. During the matchup, Randy Crews, a 6-foot 5 inch high school All-American guard from Bradley-Bourbonnais Community High School, became a defensive stopper in just his second varsity game by taking on the 6 foot 9 inch Hayes. The Illini were forced to use a slow-down style to keep the game close and stayed with the Cougars the whole game, losing by a final score of 54-46.

During the remainder of the season, the Illini defeated such teams as Georgia Tech, Texas El Paso, Notre Dame, Michigan State, Iowa and Michigan. Unfortunately, the Ilini would lose 7 of their last 9 games of the Big Ten season to finish with a 6-8 conference record and an 11-13 mark overall, good for a second straight 7th-place finish in the Big Ten.

Positive signs for the Illini included a freshman team that included future varsity players Greg Jackson, Fred Miller, Rick Howat and Bob Windmiller. As sophomores, they would combine with returnees Dave Scholz, Randy Crews, future New York Knicks draft pick Mike Price, Alabama transfer Jodie Harrison, Dennis Pace and walk-on Les Busboom to form the best group Schmidt would ever coach.  Scholz would finish this season by being named 1st team All-American by the Helms Foundation and to the Converse honorable mention All-American team.

The 1967-68 team's starting lineup included Crews and Benny Louis at the forward spots, Price and Harrison as guards and Scholz at center.

Roster

Source

Schedule
												
Source																
												

|-												
!colspan=12 style="background:#DF4E38; color:white;"| Non-Conference regular season

	

|-
!colspan=9 style="background:#DF4E38; color:#FFFFFF;"|Big Ten regular season

|-

Player stats

Awards and honors
Dave Scholz
Team Most Valuable Player 
1st team All-American (Helms)
Honorable Mention All-American (Converse)

Team players drafted into the NBA

*Dunlap was forced to skip his last two years of basketball due to the "Slush-Fund" scandal in 1966.

Rankings

References

Illinois Fighting Illini
Illinois Fighting Illini men's basketball seasons
1967 in sports in Illinois
1968 in sports in Illinois